ESOS may refer to:
The Energy Savings Opportunity Scheme - a UK scheme compatible with the EU Energy Efficiency Directive
 Enterprise Storage OS - a Linux distribution that serves storage area networks
 Earth Simulator Operating System - the operating system for the Earth Simulator supercomputer
The Educational Services for Overseas Students Act 2000 or ESOS Act 2000, relevant to Education in Australia